Rachel (Modern: Raḥel, Tiberian: Rāḫēl, Rāḥēl), meaning "ewe", is a feminine given name of Hebrew origin, popularized by the biblical figure Rachel, the wife of Israelite patriarch Jacob.

Ashkenazi Jewish matronymic surnames Rokhlin (variants: Rochlin, Rohlin), Raskin, Raskine, Rashkin, Rashkind are derived from variants of the name. The Jewish version of the surname Ruskin is an Americanized form of Raskin.

Sixteenth century baptismal records from England show that Rachel was first used by English Christians in the mid-1500s, becoming popular during the Protestant Reformation along with other names from the Bible.

Usage
The name has been among the five hundred most commonly used names in recent years for newborn girls in France, Ireland, Israel, United Kingdom and the United States.

Variants
Rachey, Rahel, Rocha, Rochel, Rochie, Rochale, Rochele, Rochlin, Recha, Reche, Reichil, Rela, Releh, Relin, Reiyelina, Rekel, Rikel, Rikla, Rikle, Rasha, Rashe, Rashi, Rashel, Rachelle, Rashil, Rashka, Rashke
 Rashka, Rashke, Slavic-language-influences Ashkenazi Jewish Yiddish-language, diminutive
 Recha, a diminutive; an example is Rachel (Recha), the daughter of the protagonist of the 1779 play Nathan the Wise.

In various languages
 Rachael, Rachelle, Racquel 
 Rachela (Polish)
 Rachele (Italian)
 Rachelle (French)
 Racquela (English)
 Ráhelm (Hungarian)
 Rahelki/Rachel (German, Hebrew, Polish, Welsh, Indonesian)
 Rahela (Hawaiian, Romanian, Croatian)
 راحله (Raheleh) (Persian)
 Ráichéal (Irish)
 Raahel (Malayalam)
 Ραχήλ (Rachíl) (Greek)
 Raakel (Finnish)
 Rakel (Scandinavian)
 Rakeri (Kikuyu)
 රාකෙල් (Rakel) (Sinhala)
 Raichel (Tamil)
 రాహేలు Raahélu (Telugu)
 Raheli (Swahili)
 Rakeli (Yoruba)
 Rakul(Faroese)
 Raquel (Catalan, Galician, Portuguese, Spanish)
 Rahel/Racha (Arabic)
 ریچل (Rachel) (Urdu)
ራሄል (Amharic)

The name may refer to:
 Rachel, Biblical figure known for being the wife that Jacob loved
 Rachel, wife of Rabbi Akiva (1st century)
 Rachel (born 1942), French singer of the 1960s
 Rachel of Kittery, Maine (died 1695), American slave murdered by her owner
 Rachel Aaron, American author
 Rachel Aberlin, 16th-century Jewish mystic
 Rachel Alejandro (born 1974), Filipino singer and actress
 Rachel Allen (born 1972), Irish celebrity chef
 Rachel Amanda (born 1995), Indonesian actress, singer and model
 Rachel Ames (born 1929), American actress
 Rachel Anderson (born 1943), English journalist and author
 Rachel Anderson (football agent), the UK's first female FIFA-licensed agent
 Rachel Ankeny, professor of history and philosophy of science at University of Adelaide
 Rachel Antonoff (born 1981), American fashion designer
 Rachel Attas (1934–2004), Israeli actress and singer
 Rokhl Auerbakh (Rachel Auerbach) (1903–1976), Polish-Israeli writer, essayist, historian, and Holocaust scholar
 Rachel Azaria (born 1977), Israeli politician
 Rachel Tzvia Back, Israeli poet and translator
 Rachel Balkovec (born 1987), American baseball manager
 Rachel Yanait Ben-Zvi (1886–1979), Israeli author and first lady of Israel
 Rachel Bess, American artist
 Rachel Bilson (born 1981), American actress
 Rachel Blanchard, Canadian actress
 Rachel Bloom (born 1987), American actress
 Rachel Bluwstein (1890–1931), usually referred to simply as "Rachel", Hebrew-language poet from Palestine
 Rachel Bolan, born James Southworth in 1966, American bassist of Skid Row
 Rachel Boston (born 1982), American actress and producer
 Rachel Brand (born 1973), American lawyer and government official
 Rachel Brosnahan (born 1990), American actress
 Rachel Brown (born 1980), English footballer
 Rachel Caine (1962–2020), American writer
 Rachel Cameron (1924–2011), American ballet dancer and teacher
 Rachel Campos-Duffy (born 1971), American television personality
 Rachel Carns (born 1969), American musician and artist
 Rachel Carson (1907–1964), American environmentalist, scientist
 Rachel Chalkowski (born 1939), Israeli midwife and gemach organiser
 Rachel Chiesley, Lady Grange (1679–1745), Scottish woman kidnapped by her husband
 Rachel Corrie (1973–2003), American political activist
 Rachel Corsie (born 1989), Scottish footballer
 Rachel Cosgrove Payes (1922–1998), American author
 Rachel Covey (born 1998), American actress
 Rachel Crow (born 1998), American actress and singer
 Rachel Cusk (born 1967), Canadian-born novelist
 Rachel Daly (born 1991), English footballer
 Rachel Anne Daquis (born 1987), Filipino volleyball player
 Rachel David (born 1996), Indian actress
 Rachel de Montmorency (1891–1961), English painter and stained glass artist
 Rachel de Queiroz (1910–2003), Brazilian author, translator, and journalist
 Rachel Lilian Alfreda de Silva (1920–2001), Sri Lankan Sinhala poet, journalist, and screenwriter
 Rachel Dolezal (born 1977), American former civil rights activist known for falsely claiming to be African American
 Rachel Don (1866–1941), New Zealand preacher and activist
 Rachel Dratch (born 1966), American actress
 Rachel Dror (born 1921), German holocaust survivor
 Rachel Eckroth, American singer-songwriter and keyboardist
 Rachel Ehrenfeld, American terrorism expert
 Rachel Elior (born 1949), Israeli historian and philosopher
 Rachel Elkind-Tourre (born 1939), American musician and record producer
 Rachel Elnaugh (born 1964), British entrepreneur
 Rachel Entwistle née Souza (1980–2006), American murder victim
 Rachel Erickson (born 1999), Canadian curler
 Rachel Evans, Welsh chemist
 Rachel Held Evans (1981–2019), American writer
 Rachel Fabri (born 1985), Maltese singer-songwriter
 Rachel Fannan (born 1986), American singer, songwriter, and poet
 Rachel Feinstein (artist) (born 1971), American artist
 Rachel Feinstein (comedian), American actress and stand-up comedian
 Rachel Félix (1821–1858), French actress (born Elisabeth Rachel Félix, better known as Mademoiselle Rachel)
 Rachel Lyman Field (1894–1942), American poet, novelist and children's fiction writer
 Rachel G. Fox (born 1996), American actress and singer
 Rachel Freier (born 1965), American judge
 Rachel Fuller (born 1973), British singer-songwriter
 Rachel Furness (born 1988), Northern Irish footballer
 Rachel Garcia (born 1997), American softball player
 Rachel Kaadzi Ghansah (born 1981), American essayist
 Rachel Goswell (born 1971), English singer-songwriter
 Rachel Grant (born 1977), English actress and TV presenter
 Rachel Griffith (born 1963), British-American economist
 Rachel Griffiths (born 1968), Australian actress and director
 Rachel Eliza Griffiths (born 1978), American poet, novelist, and photographer
 Rachel Gurney (1920–2001), English actress
 Rachel Hardiman (born 1961), Irish cricketer
 Rachel Harris (born 1979), Australian swimmer
 Rachel M. Harter, American statistician
 Rachel Haugh, English architect
 Rachel Hill (born 1995), American soccer player
 Rachel Hilson (born 1995), American actress
 Rachel Hoffman (1984–2008), American murder victim
 Rachel Hofstetter (born 1992), American video game streamer
 Rachel Hollis (born 1983), American author and motivational speaker
 Rachel Homan (born 1989), Canadian curler
 Rachel Hopkins (born 1972), British Labour MP
 Rachel Hopkins (cricketer) (born 1992), English cricketer
 Rachel House (actress) (born 1971), New Zealand actress and director
 Rachel Hunter (born 1969), New Zealand supermodel and actress
 Rachel Hurd-Wood (born 1990), British actress
 Rachel Ikemeh, Nigerian conservationist
 Rachel Imison (born 1978), Australian field hockey player
 Rachel Ingalls (1941–2019), American author
 Rachel Isaacs, American rabbi
 Rachel Isadora (born 1953), American children's author, illustrator, and painter
 Rachel Jackson (1767–1828), wife of U.S. President Andrew Jackson
 Rachel Jacobs (1975–2015), American businesswoman
 Rachel Jarry (born 1991), Australian basketball player
 Rachel Jewkes, South African scientist
 Rachel Johnson (born 1965), British journalist, television presenter, and author
 Rachel Johnson (athlete) (born 1993), American track and field athlete
 Rachel Jones, multiple people
 Rachel Joyce, multiple people
 Rachel Keller (born 1992), American actress
 Rachel Kempson (1910–2003), English actress
 Rachel Kerr, British singer-songwriter and entrepreneur
 Rachel Khoo (born 1980), British cook and writer
 Rachel Klamer (born 1990), Dutch triathlete
 Rachel E. Klevit, American biochemist
 Rachel Kolly d'Alba (born 1981), Swiss soloist violinist
 Rachel Korine (born 1986), American actress
 Rachel Kushner (born 1968), American novelist
 Rachel Leah Jones (born 1970), American-Israeli documentary film director and producer
 Rachel Levine (born 1957), transgender American assistant secretary of health
 Gertrude Rachel Levy (1884–1966), British author and cultural historian writing as G. Rachel Levy
 Rachel Lindsay (television personality) (born 1985), American television personality
 Rachel Llanes (born 1991), American ice hockey player
 Rachel Lloyd (born 1975), British activist
 Rachel Lloyd (1839–1900), American chemist
 Rachel Luttrell (born 1971), Tanzanian-Canadian actress
 Rachel MacNair (born 1958), American sociologist and psychologist
 Rachel Maddow (born 1973), American journalist
 Rachel Meghan Markle (born 1981), Duchess of Sussex and former American actress
 Rachel Marsden (born 1974), Canadian political columnist
 Rachel McAdams (born 1978), Canadian actress
 Rachel McAlpine (born 1940), New Zealand poet, novelist, and playwright
 Rachel McCann (born 1993), New Zealand field hockey player
 Rachel McLean (1971–1991), British murder victim
 Rachel McLish (born 1955), American bodybuilder, actress, and author
 Rachel Lambert Mellon (1910–2014), American horticulturalist, philanthropist, and art collector
 Rachel Miner (born 1980), American actress
 Rachel Mitchell (born 1967), American attorney
 Rachel Morrison (born 1978), American cinematographer and director
 Rachel Newton (born 1985), Scottish singer and harpist
 Rachel Neylan (born 1982), Australian cyclist
 Rachel Nicholls, English opera singer
 Rachel Nichols, multiple people
 Rachel Nickell (1968–1992), British murder victim
 Rachel Noerdlinger (born 1970), American publicist
 Rachel Nordlinger, Australian linguist
 Rachel Notley (born 1964), Canadian politician
 Rachel O'Reilly, British chemist
 Rachel O'Riordan (born 1974), Irish theatre director
 Rachel Oakes Preston (1809–1868), American religious figure
 Rachel Oliver (born 1971), New Zealand footballer
 Rachel Oliver (scientist), British material scientist
 Rachel Ong (born 1972), Singaporean politician
 Rachel Oniga (1957–2021), Nigerian actress
 Rachel Owen (1968–2016), Welsh photographer, printmaker, and lecturer
 Rachel Owens (born 1972), American sculptor
 Rachel Parish (born 1981), British sportswoman
 Rachel Parris (born 1984), English comedian and actress
 Rachel Parsons, multiple people
 Rachel Paulose (born 1973), American attorney
Florence Jane Short (aka Rachel Peace) (1881 – died after 1932), British feminist and suffragette
 Rachel Perkins (born 1970), Australian director, producer, and screenwriter
 Rachel Peters (born 1991), Miss Universe Philippines 2017
 Rachel Platten (born 1981), American singer and songwriter
 Rachel Pollack (born 1945), American science fiction writer, comic book writer, and tarot expert
 Rachel Portman (born 1960), British composer
 Rachel Potter (born 1984), American singer and actress
 Rachel Justine Pries, American mathematician
 Rachel Qitsualik-Tinsley, Canadian writer
 Rachel Quon (born 1991), American-Canadian soccer player
 Rachel Rath (born 1976), Irish actress
 Rachel Reeves (born 1979), British MP for the Labour Party
 Rachel Reilly (born 1984), American television personality and actress
 Rachel Reinert (born 1989), American country singer and songwriter
 Rachel Riley (born 1986), British television presenter
 Rachel Roberts, multiple people
 Rachel Robinson (born 1922), American professor and nurse
 Rachel Rodriguez-Williams, American politician
 Rachel Rose (born 1970), Canadian poet, essayist, and short story writer
 Rachel Rose (artist) (born 1986), American artist
 Rachel Rossi (born 1983), American criminal justice lawyer
 Rachel Roy (born 1974), American fashion designer
 Rachel Scott (1981–1999), a victim in the Columbine High School massacre
Rachel Scott (women's education reformer) née Cook (1848–1905), British women's education reformer, promoted equality for women
 Rachel Sebati (born 1993), South African footballer
 Rachel Irene Seibert (1876–1967), American clubwoman
 Rachel Sennott (born 1995), American actress and comedian
 Rachel Shelley (born 1969), English actress and model
 Rachel Shenton, English actress and screenwriter
 Rachel Shoaf (born 1996), American convicted of murder in 2013
 Rachel Smith (born 1985), Miss USA 2007
 Rachel Smith (gymnast) (born 1993), British rhythmic gymnast
 Rachel Stephens (1930–2011), American actress
 Rachel Stevens (born 1978), English pop singer, best known as a member of the band S Club 7
 Rachel Stevens (sculptor), American sculptor
 Rachel Stuart (born 1972), Jamaican-Canadian model and actress
 Rachel Sutherland (born 1976), New Zealand field hockey player
 Rachel Sweet (born 1962), American producer, singer, and actress
 Rachel Talalay (born 1958), American director and producer
 Rachel Talbot Ross (born 1961), American politician and activist
 Rachel Thomas, multiple people
 Rachel Ticotin (born 1958), American film and television actress
 Rachel Trachtenburg (born 1993), American rock singer and drummer
 Rachel Treweek (born 1963), British Anglican bishop
 Rachel True (born 1968), American actress
 Rachel Tucker (born 1981), Northern Irish musical theatre actress, and singer
 Rachel Uchitel (born 1975), American nightclub manager and television personality
 Rachel Unitt (born 1982), English footballer
 Rachel Vail (born 1966), American author
 Rachel Vallarelli, American lacrosse player
 Rachel van Cutsen (born 1984), Dutch badminton player
 Rachel van Dantzig (1878–1949), Dutch sculptor
 Rachel Van Hollebeke (born 1985), American soccer player
 Rachel Veltri (born 1978), American actress
 Rachel Viollet (born 1972), British tennis player
 Rachel Wacholder (born 1975), American professional beach volleyball player 
 Rachel Wade (born 1990), American teenager convicted of murder
 Rachel Walker (disambiguation), several people
 Rachel Ward (born 1957), English-born Australian actress, columnist, film director, and screenwriter
 Rachel Ward (mathematician), American applied mathematician
 Rachel Weisz (born 1970), British actress
 Rachel Whetstone (born 1968), British public relations executive
 Rachel White, multiple people
 Rachel Whiteread (born 1963), English sculptor
 Rachel Williams (born 1967), American model and television presenter
 Rachel Williams (footballer) (born 1988), English footballer
 Rachel DeLoache Williams (born 1988), American writer
 Rachel Willis-Sørensen (born 1984), American opera singer
 Rachel O. Wingate (c. 1901–1953), English linguist
 Rachel Yakar (born 1938), French opera singer
 Rachel Yang (born 1982), Singaporean pole vaulter
 Rachel Yankey (born 1979), English footballer
 Rachel Yehuda (born 1959), American psychiatrist and neuroscientist
 Rachel Yeoh, Malaysian socialite and model
 Rachel York (born 1971), American actress and singer
 Rachel Yurkovich (born 1986), American javelin thrower
 Rachel Z, American pianist and keyboardist
 Rachel Zadok (born 1972), South African writer
 Rachel Zajac, New Zealand forensic psychologist
 Rachel Zeffira, Canadian singer
 Rachel Zegler (born 2001), American actress and singer
 Rachel Zilberberg (1920–1943), Polish resistance fighter during World War II
 Rachel Zimmerman (born 1972), Canadian space scientist and inventor
 Rachel Zoe (born 1971), American fashion designer, businesswoman, and writer
 Rachel Zolf (born 1968), Canadian-American poet
 Rachel Zucker (born 1971), American poet

Women named Rachael
 Hecate (musician) (born 1976), born Rachael Kozak, Swiss music producer
 Rachael Anderson (died 2018), American female murder victim
 Rachael Bella (born 1984), American actress, best known for her role in the 2002 film The Ring
 Rachael Blackmore (born 1989), Irish jockey
 Rachael Blake (born 1971), Australian actress
 Rachael Bland (1978–2018), Welsh BBC newsreader
 Rachael Boyle (born 1991), Scottish footballer
 Rachael Carpani (born 1980), Australian actress
 Rachael Denhollander (born 1984), American lawyer, former gymnast and survivor
 Rachael Leigh Cook (born 1979), American actress
 Rachael Finch (born 1988), Miss Universe Australia 2009, 3rd runner-up at Miss Universe 2009
 Rachael Flatt (born 1992), American figure skater
 Rachael Grinham (born 1977), Australian squash player
 Rachael Harris (born 1968), American actress and comedian
 Rachael Heyhoe Flint (1939–2017), English cricketer
 Rachael Lampa (born 1985), American singer/songwriter best known for her work in the anime series Revolutionary Girl Utena
 Rachael MacFarlane (born 1976), American voice actress and sister of Seth MacFarlane
 Rachael McLaren, Canadian dancer
 Rachael Price (born 1985), American jazz vocalist and lead vocalist of the band Lake Street Dive
 Rachael Ray (born 1968), American celebrity chef and television personality
 Rachael Runyan (1979–1982), American murder victim
 Rachael Sage, American songwriter
 Rachael Scdoris (born 1985), blind American dog musher and cross country runner
 Rachael Sporn (born 1968), Australian female basketball player
 Rachael Stirling (born 1977), British actress best known for the BBC drama Tipping the Velvet
 Rachael Stolzenberg-Solomon, American epidemiologist and dietitian 
 Rachael Taylor (born 1984), Australian actress
 Rachael Yamagata (born 1977), American singer-songwriter

Women named Rachelle
 Rachelle Lefevre (born 1979), Canadian actress
 Rachelle Ann Go (born 1986), Filipina singer
 Rachelle Ferrell (born 1964), American vocalist and musician

Women named Rahel
 Rahel Graf (born 1989), Swiss footballer
 Rahel Indermaur (born 1980), Swiss opera singer
 Rahel Jaeggi (born 1967), German philosopher
 Rahel Kiwic (born 1991), Swiss footballer
 Rahel Varnhagen (1771–1833), German writer
 Rahel Vigdozchik (born 1989), Israeli rhythmic gymnast

Women named Rachele
 Rachele Bruni (born 1990), Italian swimmer
 Rachele Fogar (born 1991), Italian model and television personality
 Rachele Lynae (born 1988), American country rock singer
 Rachele Mussolini (1890–1979), wife of Italian dictator Benito Mussolini
 Rachele Sangiuliano (born 1981), Italian volleyball player

Women named Rakel or Raakel
 Rakel Liehu (born 1939), Finnish writer

Fictional characters named Rachel (or variants thereof)
 Rachael, a character in Hard Times.
 Rachel, one of the six main characters of Animorphs
Rachel, a character from the Rhapsody in Blue segment of the Disney movie Fantasia 2000
Rachael, a replicant in sci-fi movie Blade Runner
 Rachel, a friend of Vivian Ward and Kit DeLuca in the romantic movie Pretty Woman
 Rachel, a character in Pokémon Masters EX
Rachael (Battle Arena Toshinden), a character in the Battle Arena Toshinden fighting game series
Rachel (Ninja Gaiden), a female warrior from the Ninja Gaiden series of video games
Naughty Rachel, in the British TV Series Green Wing
Rachel Aldridge, Lady Sinderby, a character introduced in season 5 of the TV show Downton Abbey
 Rachel Alucard, in the BlazBlue video game series
 Rachel Amber, a side character in Life Is Strange and a main character in its spinoff, Life Is Strange: Before the Storm
 Rachel Berry, in the television series Glee
 Rachel Brown, in the play Inherit the Wind
 Rachel Carruthers, in the Halloween film series
Rachel Chu, in the American romantic comedy-drama film Crazy Rich Asians
 Rachel Creed, wife of the main character in Stephen King's 1983 horror novel Pet Sematary
 Rachel Elizabeth Dare, in the young adult book series Percy Jackson & the Olympians
Rachel Dalles, a character in the Black Butler manga series and anime
 Rachel Dawes, Assistant District Attorney in the Batman series of movies
 Rachel Duncan, in the TV show Orphan Black
 Rachel Finer, in the Netflix series  Grand Army
Rachel Gardner, in the Angels of Death video game
 Rachel Gatina, in the TV show One Tree Hill
 Rachel Gibson, in Season 5 of Alias
 Rachel Green, in the TV series Friends
 Rachel Greene, a character in the TV series ER, daughter of Mark Greene
 Rachel Kinski, a character in the Australian TV show Neighbours
Rachel Lynde, a supporting character in Lucy Maud Montgomery's 1908 novel Anne of Green Gables
 Rachel Mason, Headmistress of Waterloo Road in the BBC drama Waterloo Road
 Rachel Menken, Don Draper's client's daughter and a love interest in Mad Men
 Rachel Moore, of Case Closed (Detective Conan)
 Rachel Raskin, a character in The Fairly OddParents: Fairly Odder
 Rachel Roth, the false civilian name of Raven (DC Comics)
 Rachel Summers, a character in the Marvel Universe, daughter of Scott Summers and Jean Grey
 Rachel Taub, a supporting character on the TV show House, the wife of Dr. Chris Taub
 Rachel Teller, a character in the Need for Speed Underground 2
 Rachel Tice, a recurring character in the web series The Most Popular Girls in School
 Rachel Walker, a main character in the Rainbow Magic book franchise
 Rachel Wilson, a minor character in the Cartoon Network series The Amazing World of Gumball
Rachel Zane, a character in the American TV show Suits
 Rachel, a character in the manga and anime series Edens Zero who is the mother of the main heroine Rebecca Bluegarden

See also
 
 Raquel (includes Racquel)
Rokhlin (includes Rochlin)

References

Feminine given names
Hebrew feminine given names
Jewish feminine given names
Given names
English feminine given names
English-language feminine given names